Warpath is the second studio album by American death metal band Six Feet Under. Tracks on this album include "Death or Glory", which is a cover of a song originally done by Holocaust, and "4:20", a song four minutes and twenty seconds in length which, according to the liner notes, was recorded at 4:20 PM on April 20, 1997. The last album to feature founding guitarist Allen West.

Critical reception

In 2005, Warpath was ranked number 334 in Rock Hard magazine's book The 500 Greatest Rock & Metal Albums of All Time.

Track listing
All songs written by Chris Barnes and Allen West, except "Death or Glory" (Holocaust cover).

Personnel
Six Feet Under
Chris Barnes – vocals
Allen West – guitars
Terry Butler – bass
Greg Gall – drums

Production
Produced by Brian Slagel
Engineered by Bill Metoyer and Mitchell Howell
Mixed by Brian Slagel at Morrisound Studios
Mastered by Eddy Schreyer at Oasis Mastering

Artwork
Cover arts and logos by Chris Barnes
Graphics by Bryan Ames
 Photography by Tim Hubbard

References

External links
 Six Feet Under's Home Page

Six Feet Under (band) albums
1997 albums
Metal Blade Records albums